The Epic Tales of Captain Underpants is an American animated web television series produced by DreamWorks Animation Television that is based on the film Captain Underpants: The First Epic Movie, which in turn is based on the Captain Underpants series of books by Dav Pilkey.

Series overview

Episodes

Season 1 (2018)

Season 2 (2019)

Season 3 (2019)

The Epic Tales of Captain Underpants in Space! (2020)

Specials (2019–2020) 
In October 2019, Netflix released a 46-minute Halloween special of the series titled The Spooky Tale of Captain Underpants: Hack-a-Ween. In February 2020, an interactive special titled Captain Underpants: Epic Choice O' Rama was released. In December 2020, a 46-minute Christmas special titled Captain Underpants: Mega Blissmas was released.

References

External links

Epic Tales of Captain Underpants